The 2012–13 FIS Snowboard World Cup was a multi race tournament over a season for snowboarding. The season started on 28 August 2012 and ended on 27 March 2013. The World Cup was organised by the FIS which also runs world cups and championships in alpine skiing, cross-country skiing, ski jumping, Nordic combined, and freestyle skiing. The FIS Snowboarding World Cup consisted of the parallel slalom, snowboard cross and the halfpipe. The men's side of the world cup also consisted of a big air competition.

Calendar

Men

Parallel Slalom

Snowboard Cross

Half-pipe

Slopestyle

Big Air

Women

Parallel Slalom

Snowboard Cross

Half-pipe

Slopestyle

Standings

source:

Medal table

References

External links
 FIS Snowboard World Cup calendar
 FIS Snowboard World Cup results

FIS Snowboard World Cup
FIS Snowboard World Cup
FIS Snowboard World Cup
Qualification events for the 2014 Winter Olympics